Philippines participated in the 2014 Asian Beach Games in Phuket, Thailand from 14 to 23 November 2014. Maybelline Masuda clinched Philippines' first Asian Beach Games Gold Medal in Women's –50 kg Ju-jitsu. Annie Ramirez immediately followed with another gold copping the Women's –60 kg Ju-jitsu.

Philippines ended their campaign with 3 gold medals, 2 silver medals, 7 bronze medals and a total of 12 medals, finishing fourteenth on the medal table. The Philippines Team achieved its best finish since the start of the Beach Games.

Medalists

Gold

Silver

Bronze

Multiple

Medal summary

By sports

By date

Air Sports

Beach Basketball

Women's 3-on-3 Basketball

Final Rank
5th Place

Beach Flag Football

Preliminary round

Beach Handball

Women's Beach Handball

Placement 9th–10th

Beach Modern Pentathlon

Beach Volleyball

Pool F 

|}

Pool G

|}

Knockout round

Beach Wrestling

Extreme Sports

Jet Ski 
November 17

Ju-jitsu

Muay Thai 

RSCH = Referee Stop Contest Head Blows
WO = Walkover
RET = Retired
RSCO = Referee Stop Contest Outclassed
KOB = Knockout Body

Pétanque

Mixed doubles

Squash

Sailing

Triathlon

Duathlon

Triathlon

References

External links
NOC - Overview - Philippines

Nations at the 2014 Asian Beach Games
2014
Asian Beach Games